The Pratt Test is a simple test to check for deep vein thrombosis in the leg.  It involves having the patient lie supine with the leg bent at the knee, grasping the calf with both hands and pressing on the popliteal vein in the proximal calf.  If the patient feels pain, it is a sign that a deep vein thrombosis exists.

See also
 Pratt's sign

References

Coagulopathies
Diseases of veins, lymphatic vessels and lymph nodes
Hematology
Symptoms and signs: Vascular